Giannis Gaitatzis (20 April 1944) is a retired Greek football midfielder and later manager.

References

1944 births
Living people
Greek footballers
Olympiacos F.C. players
Super League Greece players
Greek football managers
GAS Ialysos 1948 F.C. managers
Panelefsiniakos F.C. managers
Acharnaikos F.C. managers
Ethnikos Piraeus F.C. managers
Association football midfielders
Greece international footballers
Footballers from Xanthi